Jun-seo, also spelled Joon-seo, or Joon-suh, Jun-suh, is a South Korean masculine given name. The meaning differs based on the hanja used to write each syllable of the name. There are 43 hanja with the reading "joon" and 53 hanja with the reading  "seo" on the South Korean government's official list of hanja which may be used in given names. Jun-seo was the fourth-most popular name for newborn boys in South Korea in 2008 and 2009.

See also
List of Korean given names

References

Korean masculine given names